East Tambaram is a neighborhood in Chennai, a city located on the east coast of South India. It is one of the main residential areas of the metropolitan region. It features the main shopping center, Poondi Bazaar, a large park and library. Many of the streets are named after writers and poets of India, including Kambar Street, Vyasar Street, Bharadwajar Street, Kalamegam Street, Manimegalai Street, and Thiruvalluvar Street and Alwars like Nammalwar Street, Kulasekara Alwar Street, Madhurakavi Alwar Street, Thirumangai Alwar Street, Periya alwar street and Andal Street.

East Tambaram has many schools that attract the children and young adults of Chennai. The local college is Madras Christian College.

Neighbourhoods in Chennai